SS William L. Watson was a Liberty ship built in the United States during World War II. She was named after William L. Watson, the first Agricultural Agent for Duval County, Florida, also active in the Florida 4-H club.

Construction
William L. Watson was laid down on 6 June 1944, under a Maritime Commission (MARCOM) contract, MC hull 2310, by J.A. Jones Construction, Panama City, Florida; she was sponsored by Mrs. John Simon, and launched on 13 July 1944.

History
She was allocated to Black Diamond Steamship Co., on 26 July 1944. On 6 June 1946, she was laid up in the National Defense Reserve Fleet, in the Hudson River Group. On 17 December 1946, she was transferred to the Italian Government, which in turn sold her to Salvatore Tagliavia, Palermo, Italy, on 27 December 1946. She was renamed Panormus. In 1952, she was sold to Transmediterranea Soc. di Nav. per Azioni, Palermo. In 1962, she was sold to San Antonio Inc, reflagged for Lebanon, and renamed Al Keheir. In 1966, she was laid up in Spezia, after developing cracks in her hull. She was scrapped the following year in Spezia.

References

Bibliography

 
 
 
 
 

 

Liberty ships
Ships built in Panama City, Florida
1944 ships
Hudson River Reserve Fleet